The statues of Madonna and Saint Bernard are outdoor sculptures by Matěj Václav Jäckel, installed on the north side of the Charles Bridge in Prague, Czech Republic.

External links
 

Monuments and memorials in Prague
Sculptures of men in Prague
Sculptures of women in Prague
Statues on the Charles Bridge
Statues of the Madonna and Child